This is a list of presidential trips made by Bashar al-Assad during his presidency, which began with his inauguration on 17 July 2000.

Summary
The number of visits per country where President Assad traveled are:
 One: Algeria, Argentina, Armenia, Austria, Azerbaijan, Brazil, Bulgaria, China, Croatia, Cuba, Cyprus, Germany, Greece, Italy, India, Kuwait, Libya, Morocco, Oman, Romania, Sudan, Slovakia, Spain, Ukraine, United Kingdom, Vatican City, Venezuela, Yemen
 Two: Jordan, Lebanon, Tunisia
 Three: Egypt, Turkey
 Four: France, Qatar,  United Arab Emirates
 Five: Saudi Arabia
 Six: Iran
 Seven: Russia

2000 
October

2001 
March
  – Attended the Arab Summit in Amman

April
 
 

June
 

July

2002 
February
 

March
 

December

2003 
December

2004 
May
  – Attended the Arab Summit in Tunis

June
 

July
 

November
  – Attended the funeral of President Zayed bin Sultan Al Nahyan

2005 

January
 

March
  – Attended the Arab Summit in Algiers

April
  – Attended the funeral of Pope John Paul II

August
  – Attended the funeral of King Fahd

2006 
January
 

March
 
 

June

2007 
February
 

March
  – Attended the Arab Summit in Riyadh

October

2008 
June
 
 
 

July
 

August

2009 
January
 

March
 
 

April
 
 

June
 

July
 

August
 

September
 

October
 

November

2010 

January
 
 

March
  – Attended the Arab Summit in Sirte

May
 
 

June
 
 
 

July
 
 
 

October
 
 

November
 
 
 

December

2015 
October

2017 
November

2018 
May

2019 
February

2021 
September

2022 
March
 

May

2023 
February 
 
March

See also
 Foreign relations of Syria

References 

Bashar al-Assad
Lists of diplomatic trips
Diplomatic visits by heads of state
2000s in Syrian politics
2010s in Syrian politics
2020s in Syrian politics